Story Field at Lower Columbia College in Longview, Washington, USA, was remodeled for the 2010 Cowlitz Black Bears' inaugural season. Amenities include party suites and the Bob's Sporting Goods Party Deck in left field, the Home Plate Club in the grandstand area and picnic tables and a children's playground sponsored by Kelso, Washington's Red Lion Inn. Story Field is a premier plating field in the West Coast League, a premier summer college baseball league, that is played during the summer. It is only available to college or college-bound players. The West Coast League is an unaffiliated league.

References

Sports venues in Washington (state)
Baseball venues in Washington (state)